"So Good" is a song by Swedish singer Zara Larsson featuring American singer Ty Dolla $ign. It was released on 27 January 2017, as the fifth single from Larsson's second studio album of the same name (2017). It reached the top ten in Flanders, The Netherlands, and Sweden, as well as the top 40 in Wallonia, Denmark, Finland, and Norway.

Background and release
On 16 January 2017, Larsson announced that her next single would be called "So Good" and feature Ty Dolla $ign. She released the song on 27 January.

Music video
The music video for the song, directed by Sarah McColgan, premiered on 3 February 2017, via Larsson's Vevo channel.

Live performances
Larsson and Ty Dolla $ign performed the song live for the first time on The Ellen DeGeneres Show on 7 February 2017.
They also performed the song together on The Wendy Williams Show on 23 March 2017.

Track listing
Digital download
"So Good" (featuring Ty Dolla Sign) – 2:46

Digital download
"So Good" (featuring Ty Dolla Sign) (GOLDHOUSE Remix) – 3:25

Digital download
"So Good" (The Wild Remix) – 3:45

Charts

Certifications

References

External links

2017 singles
2017 songs
Zara Larsson songs
Ty Dolla Sign songs
Epic Records singles
Sony Music singles
Songs written by Charlie Puth
Songs written by Jacob Kasher
Songs written by LunchMoney Lewis